Rampai Sriyai née Yamfang (รำไพ ศรีใย (แย้มแฟง), born 23 February 1955) is a Thai former sports shooter and police officer. She competed at the 1988 Summer Olympics and the 1992 Summer Olympics. She served as a police officer until voluntary early retirement in 2013, when she was granted the rank of police colonel.

References

1955 births
Living people
Rampai Sriyai
Rampai Sriyai
Rampai Sriyai
Shooters at the 1988 Summer Olympics
Shooters at the 1992 Summer Olympics
Place of birth missing (living people)
Shooters at the 1986 Asian Games
Shooters at the 1990 Asian Games
Shooters at the 1994 Asian Games
Shooters at the 1998 Asian Games
Asian Games medalists in shooting
Rampai Sriyai
Rampai Sriyai
Medalists at the 1986 Asian Games
Rampai Sriyai